Double Image may refer to:

 Double Image (novel), 1998 a noir thriller by David Morrell set in modern-day Los Angeles
 Double Image (album), a 1987 album by Frank Morgan and George Cables
 A result of photographic double exposure
 In photography, a result of moving the camera during the exposure
 A stereographic image pair

See also
Double vision (disambiguation)